Leontin Chitescu (born 3 May 1980), is a professional footballer currently playing for Chiangrai United F.C., where he plays as a striker and sometimes as a midfielder.

Playing career

Vittoriosa Stars
In October 2009, Maltese First Division side Vittoriosa Stars announced that they had signed Leontin Chitescu on a free transfer.

References

External links

Profile at sport.ro
Profile at Facebook
LEO CHITESCU Interview GSP TV

Youtube
LEO CHITESCU Vittoriosa Stars 2009/10
LEO CHITESCU indonesia
LEO CHITESCU F.A. Cup
Leo Chitescu Thai Port 1-1 Chiangrai United Min. 23

1980 births
Living people
Sportspeople from Timișoara
Romanian footballers
Association football forwards
Liga II players
Liga I players
Liga III players
Liga 2 (Indonesia) players
Indonesian Premier League players
Maltese Premier League players
Leontin Chitescu
Leontin Chitescu
FC Politehnica Timișoara players
FC UTA Arad players
CFR Cluj players
FC Unirea Dej players
PSM Makassar players
Persib Bandung players
Arema F.C. players
Vittoriosa Stars F.C. players
Leontin Chitescu
Leontin Chitescu
Romanian expatriate footballers
Expatriate footballers in Indonesia
Expatriate footballers in Malta
Expatriate footballers in Thailand
Romanian expatriate sportspeople in Indonesia
Romanian expatriate sportspeople in Malta
Romanian expatriate sportspeople in Thailand